This is a list of the rivers of Portugal, including all the main stems and their tributaries.

Note: This list was taken from Lista de rios de Portugal in the Portuguese Wikipedia, with "Rio X" converted to "X River".

List

A
 Abadia le Riviera
 Agadão River
 Águeda River (Douro)
 Águeda River (Vouga)
 Albufeira River
 Alcabrichel River
 Alcantarilha River
 Alcoa River
 Alcobaça River
 Alcofra River
 Alfusqueiro River
 Algibre River
 Algoz River
 Alheda River
 Aljezur River
 Almançor River
 Almonda River
 Almorode River
 Alpiarça River, Ribeira de Ulme, Vala de Alpiarça, Alpiaçoilo River, Vala Real
 Alte River
 Alto River
 Alva River
 Alviela River
 Alvôco River
 Âncora River
 Anços River
 Angueira River
 Antuã River, Antuão River
 Arade River

 Arado River
 Arcão River
 Arcossó River 
 Arda River
 Ardila River
 Arnóia River
 Arouce River
 Arunca River
 Asnes River
 Assureira River
 Ave River
 Avia River
 Azibo River

B
 Baça River
 Baceiro River
 Balsemão river
 Bazágueda River
 Beça River or Bessa River
 Bensafrim River
 Beselga River
 Bestança River or Ribeiro de São Martinho
 Boco River or Ribeira de Boco
 Boina River
 Botão River
 Branco River

C
 Caia River
 Caima River
 Cabral River
 Cabril River (Cávado)
 Cabril River (Corgo)
 Cabril River (Tâmega)
 Cabrum River
 Cachoeiras River
 Caldo River
 Calvo River
 Carapito River
 Carvalhosa River
 Cáster River
 Castro Laboreiro River
 Cávado River
 de Cavalos River
 Cavalum River
 Ceira River
 Cercal River
 Cértima River
 Chança River
 Côa River
 Cobrão River
 Cobres River
 Coina River
 Coja River
 de Colares River
 Corgo River
 Corvo River or Dueça River
 da Costa River
 Coura River
 Criz River
 Covelas River

D
 Dão River
 Degebe River
 Dinha River
 Divor River
 Douro River
 Drave River
 Diogo River
 Douro River

E
 Eirôgo River
 Erges River
 Espiche River
 Este River
 Ega River (Portugal)
 Eiriz River

F
 Falacho River
 Febros River
 Ferreira River
 Ferro River (Portugal)
 Fervença River
 Figueira River
 Fim River ???
 Fora River ???
 Frades River (Portugal)
 Fresno River (Portugal)
 Froufe River
 Lagoa Carvos

G
 Galinhas River 
 Gerês River
 Gilão River
 Grande River (Lourinhã)
 Guadiana River

H
 Homem River

I
 Ínsua River
 Isna River
 Inha River

J
 Joanes River
 Jamor River or Ribeira do Jamor or Queluz River?
 Judeu River
 Juliano River

L
 Laboreiro River
 Labruja River
 Leça River
 Lena River (Portugal)
 Levira River
 Lima River
 Lis River
 Lizandro River or Lisandro River
 Lordelo River
 Braldu river

M
 Maçãs River
 Maior River
 Marnel River
 Massueime River
 Mau River
 Meão River
 de Mega River
 de Mel River
 Mente River
 Minho River
 Mira River
 Mondego River
 Mouro River

N
 Nabão River
 Negro River (Portugal) ???
 Neiva River
 Nisa River
 Noeime River

O
 Ocreza River or Ribeira, (afluente of Tejo River)
 Odeceixe River
 Odeleite River
 Odelouca River
 Odres River
 Olo River
 de Onor River
 Orelhão River
 Ovelha River
 Ovil River

P
 de Palhais River
 Paiva River
 Paivô River
 Peculhos River 
 Pavia River
 Peio River
 Pêra River
 Pinhão River
 Poio River
 Pombeiro River
 Pônsul River
 Prado River
 Pranto River
 Pilas River

Q
 Quarteira River
 Queijais River

R
 Rabaçal River
 Rabagão River
 Raia River
 Ramalhoso River
 Real River (Portugal)

S
 Sabor River
 Sado River
 Safarujo River
 Salas River
 Saltadouro River
 Sardoura River
 Sátão River
 Seco River (Portugal)
 Selho River
 Sever River
 Silves River
 Sizandro River
 Sor River (Portugal)
 Sordo River (Portugal)
 Sorraia River
 Sótão River
 Soure River
 Sousa River
 Sul River

T
 Tábuas River 
 Tâmega River
 Tanha River
 Távora River
 Tedinho River
 Tedo River
 Teixeira River (Douro)
 Teixeira River (Vouga)
 Tejo River (River Tagus)
 Terva River
 Tinhela River
 Tinhesa River
 Tornada River
 Torre River
 Torto River
 Torto River (Mira)
 Torto River (Portel) 
 Tio Touro River
 Trancão River
 Tripeiro River
 Tua River
 Tuela River
 Temilobos River

U
 Uíma River
 Ul River
 Unhais River
 Urtigosa River

V
 Vade River
 Varosa River
 Vascão River
 Vez River
 de Vide River
 da Vila River
 Vizela River
 Vouga River

X
 Xarrama River
 Xévora River
 Portugal River

Z
 Zêzere River
 Zela River

See also

 Geography of Europe
 List of European rivers with alternative names
 Latin names of European rivers
 European river zonation
 Relevant pages from Portuguese Wikipedia:
 :pt:Lista de rios de Portugal
 :pt:Lista de ribeiras de Portugal

References

Portugal
Rivers